Robert Lewis Fairchild (January 31, 1929 – December 1, 2019) was an American politician. He served as a Democratic member in the Texas House of Representatives from 1963 to 1965. He had four children with wife Patsy.

References

1929 births
2019 deaths
Democratic Party members of the Texas House of Representatives
People from Beaumont, Texas